USS Grayling has been the name of more than one United States Navy ship, and may refer to:

USS Grayling (SS-18), a D-class submarine launched in 1909, renamed  in 1911, and decommissioned in 1922
, a patrol vessel in commission from 1917 to 1919
, a patrol vessel in commission from 1917 to 1918
, a Tambor-class submarine launched in 1940 and lost in September 1943
, a Tench-class submarine canceled in 1945 prior to construction
, a Sturgeon-class submarine launched in 1967 and stricken in 1997

Grayling

ja:グレイリング